Tyler Moss (born June 29, 1975) is a Canadian former professional ice hockey goaltender. Moss played for the Carolina Hurricanes, Calgary Flames and Vancouver Canucks of the National Hockey League (NHL).

Playing career
Moss played junior for the local Nepean Raiders and the Kingston Frontenacs from 1991 until 1995. He was drafted in the second round, 29th overall, by the Tampa Bay Lightning in the 1993 NHL Entry Draft. He turned professional in 1995 with the Atlanta Knights and was eventually traded to the Calgary Flames in 1997. He would play 17 games for the Flames before he was traded to the Pittsburgh Penguins in 2000. He played for the Carolina Hurricanes in 2000-01 before being demoted to the minors. He remained in the North American minor leagues until 2005, when he left to play for HC Spartak Moscow.

Career statistics

Regular season and playoffs

Awards and records
 1995 - OHL First All-Star Team
 1993 - OHL All-Rookie Team
 1998 - Harry "Hap" Holmes Memorial Award (fewest goals against - AHL) (shared with Jean-Sebastien Giguere)

References

External links

1975 births
Adirondack Red Wings players
Amur Khabarovsk players
Atlanta Knights players
Calgary Flames players
Canadian expatriate ice hockey players in Russia
Canadian ice hockey goaltenders
Carolina Hurricanes players
Cincinnati Cyclones (IHL) players
Edmonton Road Runners players
Florida Hammerheads players
HC Spartak Moscow players
Ice hockey people from Ottawa
Kansas City Blades players
Kingston Frontenacs players
Living people
Lowell Lock Monsters players
Manitoba Moose players
Nepean Raiders players
Saint John Flames players
Tampa Bay Lightning draft picks
Toronto Roadrunners players
Vancouver Canucks players
Wilkes-Barre/Scranton Penguins players